The Pakistan national cricket team toured New Zealand from December 1964 to February 1965 and played a three-match Test series against the New Zealand national cricket team. All three Tests were drawn.

Pakistan also played first-class matches against all six Plunket Shield teams, two non-first-class matches against minor provincial teams, and a first-class match against a President's XI. Of these matches Pakistan won four and drew five, so they went through the tour undefeated. So, New Zealand also were undefeated.

Test series summary

First Test

Second Test

Third Test

Leading players
In the low-scoring series only one player, John Reid, reached 200 runs: he made 229 at an average of 38.16. Hanif Mohammad was Pakistan's highest scorer, with 194 runs at 38.80, and he made the only century, 100 not out in the Third Test. Six bowlers took 10 wickets or more, all of them at an average below 23. Asif Iqbal took the most, 18 at 13.77; Richard Collinge with 15 at 17.66, in his first series, was New Zealand's most successful bowler.

References

Bibliography
 Don Neely & Richard Payne, Men in White: The History of New Zealand International Cricket, 1894–1985, Moa, Auckland, 1986, pp. 335–38
 R. T. Brittenden, "Pakistan in Australia and New Zealand, 1964-65", Wisden 1966, pp. 832–44

External links
 Pakistan in New Zealand, 1964-65 at Cricinfo
 Pakistan in Australia and New Zealand 1964/65 at CricketArchive

1964 in New Zealand cricket
1964 in Pakistani cricket
1965 in New Zealand cricket
1965 in Pakistani cricket
International cricket competitions from 1960–61 to 1970
New Zealand cricket seasons from 1945–46 to 1969–70
1964-65